The Tennessee Volunteers football statistical leaders are individual statistical leaders of the Tennessee Volunteers football program in various categories, including passing, rushing, receiving, total offense, defensive stats, and kicking. Within those areas, the lists identify single-game, single-season, and career leaders. The Volunteers represent University of Tennessee in the NCAA's Southeastern Conference.

Although Tennessee began competing in intercollegiate football in 1891, the school's official record book considers the "modern era" to have begun in 1930s or 1940s, depending on the particular statistic. Records from before this time period are often incomplete and inconsistent, and they are generally not included in these lists.

These lists are dominated by more recent players for several reasons:
 Since 1940, seasons have increased from 10 games to 11 and then 12 games in length.
 The NCAA didn't allow freshmen to play varsity football until 1972 (with the exception of the World War II years), allowing players to have four-year careers.
 Bowl games only began counting toward single-season and career statistics in 2002. The Volunteers have played in 10 bowl games since then, allowing players in those seasons an extra game to accumulate statistics. Similarly, the Volunteers have played in the SEC Championship Game five times since it was first played in 1992.

These stats are updated through the end of the 2021 season.

Passing

Passing Yards

Passing Touchdowns

Passing Attempts

Passing Completions

Rushing

Rushing Yards

Rushing Touchdowns

Rushing Attempts

Receiving

Receptions

Receiving Yards

Receiving Touchdowns

Total offense
Total offense is the sum of passing and rushing statistics. It does not include receiving or returns.

Total offense yards

Touchdowns responsible for
"Touchdowns responsible for" is the NCAA's official term for combined passing and rushing touchdowns.

Defense

Interceptions

Tackles

Sacks

Kicking

Field goals made

Field goal percentage

References

Tennessee